KF ARSIMI 1973 is a football club based in the village of Çegran near Gostivar, North Macedonia. They are currently competing in the Macedonian Second League.

History

The club was founded in 1973.  

The club was formed by a group of teachers of that time, with the aim of having a football club in the region where they lived.

The club initially competed in the municipal football league of Macedonia, while later it was included in the third league of the country, a league in which it stayed until the 2021/22 season.

KF Arsimi 1973 had its biggest successes in the 2020/21 and 2021/22 seasons.

In the 2020/21 season, it was declared the runner-up of the Third West League, while later in the 2021/22 season it was declared the absolute champion of the Third West League, and won the tie against FK Ovče Pole to be included for the first time in the history of the 50 year of the club in the Macedonian Second League.

Current squad 
As of 26 February 2023.

References

External links
Arsimi Facebook 
Club info at MacedonianFootball 
Football Federation of Macedonia 

Arsimi
Association football clubs established in 1973
1973 establishments in the Socialist Republic of Macedonia
Gostivar Municipality
Arsimi